Doctor Antonio (Italian:Il dottor Antonio) is a 1914 Italian silent historical film directed by Eleuterio Rodolfi and starring Hamilton Revelle, Fernanda Negri Pouget and Alfredo Bertone. It is an adaptation of the 1855 novel Doctor Antonio by Giovanni Ruffini. In the mid-nineteenth century an Italian revolutionary falls in love with a wealthy young Englishwoman.

It was made by the Turin-based studio Ambrosio Film.

Cast
Hamilton Revelle as Dottor Antonio
Fernanda Negri Pouget as Lucy Davenne
Alfredo Bertone as Aubrey Davenne
Armand Pouget as Sir John Davenne
Cesare Zocchi as Re di Napoli
Alberto Albertini

References

Bibliography 
 Goble, Alan. The Complete Index to Literary Sources in Film. Walter de Gruyter, 1999.

External links 
 

1914 films
Italian historical romance films
Italian silent feature films
1910s historical romance films
1910s Italian-language films
Films directed by Eleuterio Rodolfi
Films set in Italy
Films set in the 19th century
Films based on Italian novels
Italian black-and-white films
Silent historical romance films